Bradley Stryker (born June 29, 1977) is an American actor, who portrayed Trey Atwood on the FOX series The O.C..

He has a lead role in the feature film, Tillamook Treasure (2006), playing Tom, the sidekick of logger Jimmy Kimbell.

Stryker also had a role in Bruce Almighty, as well as the homoerotic thrillers The Brotherhood and Wolves of Wall Street. He was "Night, Mother", a first-season episode of the television crime series CSI: NY. He also appears as lead actor in the 2004 Renault Clio and Nokia commercial directed by Carter & Blitz.

In late 2010, he portrayed the DC Comics villain Deadshot in "Shield", the second episode of Smallville's final season.

Filmography

Film

Television

References

External links 

1977 births
Living people
American male film actors
American male television actors
Male actors from Seattle